Olympus µ Tough is a family of compact digital cameras from Olympus Corporation. Among the models in the family are the 12 megapixel µ Tough-3000 and μ Tough-8000 cameras.
They are specified to be shock- and waterproof.

See also 
 Olympus Tough TG-4
Olympus Tough TG-5
Olympus Tough TG-6

References 

Olympus digital cameras